The Churcampa Province is a province located in the Huancavelica Region of Peru. It is one of the seven that make up that region. The capital of the province is Churcampa.

Boundaries
North: Tayacaja Province
East: Ayacucho Region
South: Acobamba Province
West: Huancavelica Province

Geography 
Some of the highest mountains of the province are  listed below:

Political division
The province is divided into eleven districts, which are:

 Anco (La Esmeralda)
 Chinchihuasi (Chinchihuasi)
 Churcampa (Churcampa)
 El Carmen (Paucarbambilla)
 La Merced (La Merced)
 Lacroja (Locroja)
 Pachamarca (Pachamarca)
 Paucarbamba (Paucarbamba)
 San Miguel de Mayocc (Mayocc)
 San Pedro de Coris (San Pedro de Coris)
 Cosme (Santa Clara de Cosme)

Ethnic groups 
The people in the province are mainly Indigenous citizens of Quechua descent. Quechua is the language which the majority of the population (79.11%) learnt to speak in childhood, 20.46% of the residents started speaking using the Spanish language (2007 Peru Census).

References 

Provinces of the Huancavelica Region